Antonio Briseño Vázquez (born 5 February 1994), also known as El Pollo, is a Mexican professional footballer who plays as a centre-back for Liga MX club Guadalajara.

Club career

Early career
In 2008, Briseño joined the youth academy of Atlas, successfully going through the U-17, U-20 and Premier sides. First team coach Juan Carlos Chávez eventually promoted Briseño to the first team in 2011.

Atlas
Briseño made his professional league debut with Atlas on September 30, 2011, against Chiapas. He came on as a substitute for Flavio Santos in the 86th minute of the game.
During his time at Atlas, Briseño struggled for playing time, and only managed to appear in ten matches for the club.

Tigres UANL

On 1 July 2014, Briseño was transferred to Tigres UANL. He played the second leg of the finals of the Apertura 2015 season, winning his first professional league title. He also made seven appearances in the 2015 Copa Libertadores as Tigres finished runner-up in the competition.

Struggling for playing time, Briseño was sent on loan to Ascenso MX side Juárez in 2015, and in December 2016 he was loaned out to Veracruz for the Clausura 2017 season.

Feirense
On 3 July 2017, Primeira Liga club Feirense announced the signing of Briseño on a two-year contract. On September 30, 2017, Briseño made his debut against Boavista.

On 7 April 2018, Briseño scored his first goal for Feirense in a 2–2 draw against Braga.

Guadalajara
On 2 July 2019, Liga MX club Guadalajara announced the signing of Briseño.

International career

Youth
Briseño was chosen by coach Raúl Gutiérrez to be part of the Mexican squad that would play at the 2011 FIFA U-17 World Cup, which was to be hosted in Mexico. He captained the team and played in every game, including the final against Uruguay, scoring the first goal in Mexico's 2–0 victory.

In 2012, Briseño was selected to represent Mexico at the 2012 Milk Cup held in Northern Ireland. He captained the squad to the final against Denmark, which Mexico won 3–0. Briseño was again selected by coach Sergio Almaguer to be part of the Mexican squad participating in the 2013 CONCACAF U-20 Championship. He played in every match and was named Most Valuable Player of the tournament. Briseño also participated in the 2013 Toulon Tournament, with Mexico placing sixth in the competition.

Career statistics

Club

Honours
Tigres UANL
Liga MX: Apertura 2015

Mexico Youth
FIFA U-17 World Cup: 2011
CONCACAF U-20 Championship: 2013
Central American and Caribbean Games: 2014

Individual
CONCACAF U-20 Championship Most Valuable Player: 2013
CONCACAF U-20 Championship Bext XI: 2013

References

External links

 
 
 
 
 

1994 births
Living people
Footballers from Guadalajara, Jalisco
Association football central defenders
Mexican footballers
Mexico under-20 international footballers
Mexico youth international footballers
Atlas F.C. footballers
Tigres UANL footballers
FC Juárez footballers
C.D. Veracruz footballers
C.D. Feirense players
C.D. Guadalajara footballers
Liga MX players
Ascenso MX players
Primeira Liga players
Mexican expatriate footballers
Expatriate footballers in Portugal
Mexican expatriate sportspeople in Portugal
Central American and Caribbean Games medalists in football
Central American and Caribbean Games gold medalists for Mexico
Competitors at the 2014 Central American and Caribbean Games